Baumeister is a surname. Notable people with the surname include:

 Alfred Baumeister (1934–2011), American psychologist
 Christian Baumeister (born 1971), German cinematographer
 Edward Baumeister (1848–1933), American politician
 Ernst Baumeister (born 1957), Austrian footballer
 Friedrich Christian Baumeister (1709–1785), German philosopher
 Herb Baumeister (1947–1996), U.S. serial killer
 Karin Baumeister-Rehm (born 1971), German artist
 Muriel Baumeister (born 1972), German-Austrian actress
 Ralf Baumeister (born 1961), German biologist
 Reinhard Baumeister (1833–1917), German engineer and urban planner
 Roy Baumeister (born 1953), U.S. social psychologist
 Stefan Baumeister (born 1993), German snowboarder
 Truus Baumeister (born 1907), Dutch swimmer 
 Willi Baumeister (1889–1955), German painter and graphic artist

German-language surnames